Pleasant Fields is an historic home in Laytonsville, Montgomery County, Maryland.   It is also known as the Henry Chew Gaither House.

Maryland politicians William Lingan Gaither and Henry Chew Gaither both lived here and are buried on the grounds.

The house has a sister house in the vicinity, built by the same builder, Ephraim Gaither. Clover Hill (Brookeville, Maryland)

References

Houses in Montgomery County, Maryland
Buildings and structures in Montgomery County, Maryland
Landmarks in Maryland